Taraxacum californicum, also known as the California dandelion, is an endangered species of dandelion endemic to the San Bernardino Mountains of California. It grows in mountain meadows.
  
Taraxacum californicum is a small perennial wildflower which resembles its close relative, the widespread weed known as the common dandelion (T. officinale). T. californicum has green, red-veined, lobed or toothed leaves and yellow flower heads yielding brown and white fruits.

There are fewer than 20 occurrences known of the plant, and several occurrences include just a few individuals. The plant can hybridize with the common dandelion, causing genetic pollution.

References

External links
Jepson Manual Treatment - Taraxacum californicum
Taraxacum californicum - Photo gallery

californicum
Endemic flora of California
~